Mark Richards is an Australian sailor and boatbuilder, known for his achievements as the long-time skipper of Wild Oats XI, 9 times line honours winner of the annual Rolex Sydney Hobart Yacht race.

In 1995, Richards founded Palm Beach Motor Yachts in Australia, which was acquired by Grand Banks Yachts in 2014. Richards is currently CEO of Grand Banks as a result of the acquisition.

As a professional sailor, Richards has sailed in 2 Americas Cup challenges, has achieved World Match Racing victories, has won the Sydney to Gold Coast yacht race, the 2003 Admirals Cup, and has taken out line honours and handicap honours in the prestigious Rolex Sydney to Hobart races.

Notable victories

References

1967 births
Living people
Boat builders
Sailors from Sydney
1995 America's Cup sailors